Ariya may refer to:

Music 
 Aria (band), a Russian heavy metal band, also known as Ariya

People 
 Ariya Daivari (born 1989), American professional wrestler
 Ariya Gulite (born 1941 or 1942), Soviet long track speed skater
 Ariya Hidayat, developer of PhantomJS
 Ariya Inokuchi (1856–1923), Japanese professor and mechanical technologist
 Ariya Jutanugarn (born 1995), Thai professional golfer
 Ariya Rekawa (born 1941), Sri Lankan politician, 8th governor of Uva Province
 Ariya Phounsavath (born 1991) Laotian cyclist

Vehicles 
 Nissan Ariya, a Japanese compact electric SUV

See also
 Aria (disambiguation)